Atta ur Rehman Khan (Urdu: عطا الرحمن خان) is a Pakistani computer scientist and academician who has contributed to multiple domains of the field. According to a Stanford University report, he is among World's Top 2% Scientists. He is the founder of National Cyber Crime Forensics Lab Pakistan, which operates in partnership with NR3C. He has published numerous research articles and books.  He is a senior member of IEEE and ACM.

Education 
Khan was a Bright Sparks scholar and received his PhD degree in Computer Science from University of Malaya. He received his Masters and Bachelor's degree (with honors) in Computer Science from COMSATS University under COMSATS scholarship. He has also attended a summer camp on Advance Wireless Networks at Technische Universität Ilmenau under DAAD scholarship.

Experience 
As of 2010, Khan is working as an Associate Professor at the College of Engineering and Information Technology, Ajman University, United Arab Emirates. He has experience of teaching and research at different positions and has served at seven universities, namely Sohar University, Air University, King Saud University, COMSATS University, University of Malaya and Qurtuba University.

He was the founding director of National Cyber Crime Forensics Lab Pakistan and the Head of Air University Cybersecurity Center. He also developed Pakistan's first BS cybersecurity program approved by HEC.

Editorial boards 
Atta ur Rehman Khan is an editor of the following journals:

 Associate technical editor, IEEE Communications Magazine.
 Editor, Elsevier Journal of Network and Computer Applications.
 Associate editor, IEEE Access.
 Associate editor, Springer Journal of Cluster Computing.
 Editor, SpringerPlus. 
 Editor, Ad hoc & Sensor Wireless Networks.
 Editor, Oxford Computer Journal.
 Editor, KSII Transactions on Internet and Information Systems.
 Associate editor, Springer Human-centric Computing and Information Sciences.

Gallery

Honors & Awards 
Atta ur Rehman Khan has received numerous honors and awards, such as:
 Long-Term Research Achievement Award, 2023.
 World's Top 2% Scientists, Stanford University, USA, 2022.
 World's Top 2% Scientists, Stanford University, USA, 2020.
 Best Paper Award, SPECTS, 2018.
 Research Productivity Award, COMSATS University, Islamabad, Pakistan, 2016.
 GoT Award, University of Malaya, Malaysia, 2014.
 Research Productivity Award, COMSATS University, Islamabad, Pakistan, 2012.
 Best Research Poster Award, Vision ICT, Pakistan, 2010.
 Best Project Award, Vision ICT, Pakistan, 2009.
 Best Project Award, Frontiers of Information Technology (FIT) Conference, Pakistan, 2008.

Books 
Following is the list of books authored/co-authored/edited by Atta ur Rehman Khan:

 "Internet of Things: Challenges, Advances, and Applications" by Chapman and Hall/CRC, 2018.

Research publications 
Following is the list of selected research papers authored/co-authored by Atta ur Rehman Khan:

 "Vehicular Ad Hoc Network (VANET) Localization Techniques: A Survey, " in Archives of Computational Methods in Engineering, .
 "DGRU based human activity recognition using channel state information," in Measurement, Vol. 167, 2021.
 "Real-Time Fuel Truck Detection Algorithm Based on Deep Convolutional Neural Network," in IEEE Access, vol. 8, pp. 118808–118817, 2020.
 "An energy, performance efficient resource consolidation scheme for heterogeneous cloud datacenters," in Journal of Network and Computer Applications, .
 "A lightweight and compromise‐resilient authentication scheme for IoTs," in Transactions on Emerging Telecommunications Technologies, .
 "Optimal Content Caching in Content-Centric Networks," in Wireless Communications and Mobile Computing, 
 "A Systems Overview of Commercial Data Centers: Initial Energy and Cost Analysis," in International Journal of Information Technology and Web Engineering, vol. 14, no. 1, pp. 41–65, 2019.
 "CPU–RAM-based energy-efficient resource allocation in clouds," in The Journal of Superomputing,  vol. 75, no. 11, pp. 7606–7624, 2019.
 "A fog-based security framework for intelligent traffic light control system," in Multimedia Tools and Applications, vol. 78, no. 17, pp. 24595–24615, 2019.
 "Anonymous and formally verified dual signature based online e-voting protocol," in Cluster Computing, vol. 22, no. 1, pp. 1703–1716, 2019.
 "Identification of Yeast's Interactome using Neural Networks," in IEEE Access, 2019.
 "Secure-CamFlow: A Device Oriented Security Model to Assist Information Flow Control Systems in Cloud Environments for IoTs," in Concurrency and Computation: Practice and Experience, vol. 31, no. 8, pp. 1–22, 2019.
 "SocialRec: A Context-aware Recommendation Framework with Explicit Sentiment Analysis," in IEEE Access, 2019.
 "A load balanced task scheduling heuristic for Large-scale Computing Systems," in International Journal of Computer Systems Science and Engineering, vol. 34, no. 2, pp. 1–12, 2019. 
 "Masquerading Attacks Detection in Mobile Ad Hoc Networks," in IEEE Access, vol. 6, no. 1, pp. 55013–55025, 2018.
 "Performance Assessment of Dynamic Analysis Based Energy Estimation Tools," in International Symposium on Performance Evaluation of Computer and Telecommunication Systems, pp. 1–12, July 2018, France.
 "An Optimal Ride Sharing Recommendation Framework for Carpooling Services," in IEEE Access, vol 6, no. 1, pp. 62296–62313, 2018.
 “An Investigation of Video Communication over Bandwidth Limited Public Safety Network,” in Malaysian Journal of Computer Science, vol. 31, no. 2, pp. 85–107, 2018.
 "There's No Such Thing as Free Lunch but Envy among Young Facebookers, " in KSII Transactions on Internet and Information Systems, vol. 12, no. 10, 2018.
 "Salat Activity Recognition using Smartphone Triaxial Accelerometer," in 5th International Multi-Topic ICT Conference (IMTIC), April 2018.
 "Computation Offloading Cost Estimation in Mobile Cloud Application Models," in Wireless Personal Communications, Springer, vol. 97, no. 3, pp. 4897–4920, 2017.
 "Review and Performance Analysis of Position Based Routing in VANET," in Wireless Personal Communications, vol. 94, no. 3, pp. 559–578, 2017.
 "Execution Models for Mobile Data Analytics," in IEEE IT Professional, vol. 19, no. 3, pp. 24–30, 2017.
 "Formal Verification and Performance Evaluation of Task Scheduling Heuristics for Makespan Optimization and Workflow Distribution in Large-scale Computing Systems," in International Journal of Computer Systems Science and Engineering, vol. 32, no. 3, pp. 227–241, 2017.
 " RedEdge: A Novel Architecture for Big Data Processing in Mobile Edge Computing Environments, " in  Journal of Sensor and Actuator Networks, vol. 6, no. 3, 2017. 
 "A Comparative Study and Workload Distribution Model for Re-encryption Schemes in a Mobile Cloud Computing Environment, " in International Journal of Communication Systems, vol. 30, no. 16, 2017.
 "Diet-Right: A Smart Food Recommendation System" in KSII Transactions on Internet and Information Systems, vol. 11, no. 6, pp. 2910–2925, 2017.
 "A Survey of Mobile Virtualization: Taxonomy and State of the Art, " in ACM Computing Surveys, vol. 49, no. 1, 2016. 
 "Big Data Analytics in Mobile and Cloud Computing Environments," in Innovative Research and Applications in Next-Generation High Performance Computing,  IGI Global, pp. 349–367, 2016.
 "Code Offloading Using Support Vector Machine", in Proceedings of the Sixth IEEE International Conference on Innovative Computing Technology (INTECH), August 2016, pp. 98–103.
 "Context-Aware Mobile Cloud Computing & Its Challenges," in IEEE Cloud Computing, vol. 2, no 3, pp. 42–49, May/June 2015.
 "MobiByte: An Application Development Model for Mobile Cloud Computing," in Journal of Grid Computing, vol. 13, no. 4, pp. 605–628, 2015.
 "Impact of Mobility on Energy and Performance of Clustering-Based Power-Controlled Routing Protocols," in Proceedings of the IEEE Frontiers of Information Technology, Islamabad, Pakistan, December 2015.
 "Merging of DHT-based Logical Networks in MANETs," in Transactions on Emerging Telecommunications Technologies, vol. 26, no. 12, pp. 1347–1367, 2015.
 "Resource Management in Cloud Computing: Taxonomy, Prospects and Challenges, " in Computers & Electrical Engineering, vol. 47, pp. 186–203, 2015.
 "A Cloud-Manager-based Re-encryption Scheme for Mobile Users in Cloud Environment: A Hybrid Approach, " in Journal of Grid Computing, vol. 13, no. 4, 2015.
 "3D-RP: A DHT-based Routing Protocol for MANETs," The Computer Journal, vol. 58, no. 2, 258-279, 2015.
 "A Survey of Mobile Cloud Computing Application Models" in IEEE Communications Surveys & Tutorials, vol. 16, no. 1, pp. 393–413, 2014.
 "Pirax: Framework for Application Piracy Control in Mobile Cloud Environment," in Journal of Super Computing, vol. 68, no. 2, pp. 753–776, 2014.
 "Road Oriented Traffic Information System for Vehicular Ad hoc Networks," in Wireless Personal Communications, vol. 77, no. 4, pp. 2497–2515 , 2014.
 "BSS: Block Based Sharing Scheme for Secure Data Storage Services in Mobile-Cloud Environment", in Journal of Super Computing, vol. 70, no. 2, pp. 946–976, 2014.
 "Routing Protocols for Mobile Sensor Networks: A Comparative Study," in International Journal of Computer Systems Science and Engineering, vol. 29, no. 1, pp. 91–100, 2014.
 "Incremental Proxy Re-encryption Scheme for Mobile Cloud Computing Environment," in Journal of Super Computing, vol. 68, no. 2,  pp. 624–651, 2014.
 "A Study of Incremental Cryptography for Security Schemes in Mobile Cloud Computing Environments," in Proceedings of the IEEE Symposium on Wireless Technology and Applications, Kuching, Malaysia, September 2013, pp. 62–67.
 "Enhanced Dynamic Credential Generation Scheme for Protection of User Identity in Mobile Cloud Computing," in Journal of Super Computing, vol. 66, no. 3, pp. 1687–1706, 2013.
 "Clustering-based Power-Controlled Routing for Mobile Wireless Sensor Networks," in International Journal of Communication Systems, vol. 25, no. 4, pp. 529–542, 2012.
 "Impact of Mobility Models on Clustering based Routing Protocols in Mobile WSNs," in Proceedings of the IEEE Frontiers of Information Technology, Islamabad, Pakistan, December 2012, pp. 366–370.
 "A Performance Comparison of Open Source Network Simulators for Wireless Networks," in Proceedings of the IEEE International Conference on Control System, Computing and Engineering, Penang, Malaysia, November 2012, pp. 34–38.
 "Routing Proposals for Multipath Interdomain Routing," in Proceedings of the IEEE International Multi Topic Conference, Lahore, Pakistan, December 2012, pp. 331–337.
 "Source Routing Proposals for Multipath Inter-domain Routing," in Proceedings of the International Conference on Future Trends in Computing and Communication Technologies, Malacca, Malaysia, December 2012, pp. 124–132.

References 

Pakistani computer scientists
Living people
Senior Members of the ACM
Senior Members of the IEEE
Year of birth missing (living people)